John Dukes Schroeder (July 12, 1961 – May 7, 2016), known professionally as John Stabb, was an American punk rock vocalist and frontman. Best known as one of the founding members of the hardcore punk band Government Issue; he also played in other bands including, Betty Blue, The Factory Incident, Stabb, Stain, Emma Peel, Weatherhead, and History Repeated. He was born in Washington, D.C., and raised in Rockville, Maryland, where he attended Colonel Zadok A. Magruder High School. Stabb occasionally acted and was a freelance writer for  Washington City Paper and Forced Exposure.

Personal life
Stabb married long-time partner Mina Devadas on St. Patrick’s Day 2016 while staying at Holy Cross Hospital (Silver Spring). After a 112-day battle with stomach cancer, he died at a hospice in Rockville, Maryland, on May 7, 2016, at 54.

Works outside of music

Filmography
Stabb was interviewed in Salad Days.

Blood and Steel, Cedar Crest Country Club

Non-Government Issue discography

Further reading
 Andersen, Mark; Jenkins, Mark (2001). Dance of Days: Two Decades of Punk in the Nation's Capitol. .

References

External links
Official Artist Page - John Stabb Schroeder website
John Stabb Schroeder - Discogs Discography catalog

1961 births
2016 deaths
American punk rock singers
Hardcore punk musicians
Post-hardcore musicians
American indie rock musicians
Singers from Washington, D.C.
Musicians from Rockville, Maryland
Singers from Maryland
Government Issue members